Jagarnathpur Sira  is a village development committee in Parsa District in the Narayani Zone of southern Nepal. At the time of the 2011 Nepal census, it had a population of 6741 people living in 1067 individual households. There were 3,508 males and 3,233 females at the time of census.

References

Populated places in Parsa District